The 2012 Baden Masters were held from August 31 to September 2 in Baden, Switzerland. It was the first event of the men's World Curling Tour for the 2012–13 curling season. The total purse of the event was 29,000 Swiss francs (CHF).

In the final, Sven Michel defeated Peter de Cruz with a 7–5 tally, winning 11,000 CHF of the prize money.

Teams
The teams are listed as follows:

Round-robin standings

Playoffs

References

External links
Official site 

Baden Masters, 2012
2012 in Swiss sport
Baden Masters